EFR may refer to:
 Eastern Frontier Rifles, a State Armed Police Force for the Indian state of West Bengal
 École Française de Radioélectricité, now EFREI, a French private engineering school
 Ecological fiscal reform
 Economic Faculty Association Rotterdam, at the Erasmus University Rotterdam
 EF-Tu receptor
 Enhanced full rate, a speech coding standard 
 European Financial Services Roundtable